Doyle Dean Schick (February 23, 1939 – February 27, 2001) was an American football cornerback in the National Football League for the Washington Redskins.  He played college football at the University of Kansas and was drafted in the fourteenth round of the 1961 NFL Draft. After his NFL career was over he was the head coach of several high school football teams in Kansas.

References

External links

1939 births
2001 deaths
Sportspeople from Lawrence, Kansas
Players of American football from Kansas
American football cornerbacks
Kansas Jayhawks football players
Washington Redskins players